Panathinaikos futsal is the futsal department of the Greek multisport club Panathinaikos.

History 
The first establishment of the futsal department dates back to the late 1990s, having success in the youth levels of the sport. Nevertheless, the effort did not last long enough.

On 8 August 2017 a merge with Athina 90, the most successful futsal team in Greece was announced. It was based on a 5-year deal between the two clubs and the department would compete in the Hellenic Futsal Premiere League, the top tier futsal league in the country.

On 19 May 2022, Panathinaikos announced that the club would be independently reestablished from scratch and would start from the last division of the local competitions.

Players

Current squad

 (C)

References

External links
 Official website 

Panathinaikos A.O.
2017 establishments in Greece
Futsal clubs in Greece